Frederic May Lillebridge (December 14, 1857 – September 8, 1934) was an American pianist, composer and professor at New York College of Music, a music conservatory that merged with New York University in 1968. Among others, he was attached to the Chicago Symphony Orchestra.

Biography

Fredric Lillebridge was born on December 14, 1857, in Brooklyn, New York, United States.

He studied music, specialising in piano, in America as well as in Europe, where he studied in England, France, Spain and (Germany). Among his teachers where Hans von Bülow and Carl Tausig in Berlin. He also attributed much of his success in piano work to Rafael Joseffy.

Lillebridge married the Bavarian-Swedish soprano singer Charlotte Lachs, a graduate from the Royal Conservatory of Music of Munich, Kingdom of Bavaria.

Frederic Lillebridge made multiple well-received concerts around Europe and America.

Besides his appointment as professor in New York, he served as music director to several other academic institutions. Among them were the Department of Instrumental music of Minnesota State University, Mankato in Mankato, Minnesota, together with his wife, Charlotte Lachs, who was in charge of its Department of vocal music, the music faculty of the Texas Woman's College, future merger of Texas Wesleyan University, University of Colorado, and the Music Conservatory at Ripon, Wisconsin. Furthermore, he was the dean of the music department of the National University in St. Louis.

In addition, he was president of the Co-operative Teachers' Association.

Fredric Lillebridge died on September 8, 1934, in Dallas, Texas, and was buried in St. Louis, Missouri.

Works

 Master Course of Piano Playing and Composition
 Studies in Musical Education History and Aesthetics (1916), Music Teachers National Association
 Progressive Exercises for Stretching and Making the Fingers Independent (1913), with Leopold Godowsky, St. Louis: Art Publication Society,
 Papers and proceedings at its thirty-seventh annual meeting, Buffalo, N. Y. (1916), Hartford, 320 p.
 
 
 Instrumental Work with Juveniles: Its Value and Significance (1915)

Bibliography
 Missouri Music (1924) by Ernst Christopher Krohn (Da Capo Press, Incorporated)

References

1857 births
1934 deaths
Musicians from New York (state)
American pianists
American composers
Music directors
New York College of Music faculty
Texas Woman's University faculty
Minnesota State University, Mankato faculty
American musicologists
American male pianists
American male composers